SG is the name of a class of Indian steam locomotives used for freight trains. In the designation stands S for Standard, G for Goods. It was by number of built locomotives one of the largest steam locomotive classes built in United Kingdom. The design originated from a BESA standard.

History
With the growing demand for locomotives in the British Raj it became for the British industry more and more difficult to deliver the required amount. To speed up delivery the British Engineering Standards Association (BESA) was chartered to develop standard locomotive types. The first BESA report issued in 1903 contained a design recommendation for a 4-4-0 standard passenger locomotive called SP and one for a 0-6-0 standard goods locomotive called SG. Revised versions proposed eight classes of broad gauge locomotives and four classes of meter gauge locomotives for various services. These locomotives were later called BESA locomotives.

The SG class was used by the North Western State Railway (NWR), the Eastern Bengal Railway (EBR), the East Indian Railway (EIR) and the Oudh and Rohilkhand Railway (ORR) in India, not only in front of goods trains, but also often in front of passenger trains. Some locomotives were in service in India until the early 1980s and in Pakistan until the 1990s.

Technical variants
A later built variant with Schmidt superheater was called class SGS, where the designation stands for 'Standard Goods Locomotive, Superheated'. Compared to the saturated steam version, the locomotives received larger cylinders with piston valves and larger boilers, as well as a four-axle tender with bogies.

Locomotives delivered as SG class, which were later converted to superheated locomotives were allocated to the class SGC, where the C stands for 'converted'. The class SGSC, later called SGC2, had round fireboxes instead of the Belpaire firebox of the initial version. SGC3 class locomotives were not only retrofitted with superheaters and but received also a Lentz rotary valve gear.

The 2nd class of standard goods converted locomotives, abbreviated as SGSC and later as SGC2, was another variant distinguished by round fireboxes. Despite its classification, they were used for hauling passenger and mail trains frequently.

There was also a class SG1 with unknown characteristics.

Preservation

See also
Indian Railways
Rail transport in India#History
Locomotives of India
Rail transport in India

References

Steam locomotives of India
5 ft 6 in gauge locomotives
0-6-0 locomotives
Vulcan Foundry locomotives
Robert Stephenson and Hawthorns locomotives
Freight locomotives
Passenger locomotives
Scrapped locomotives